The 6mm Musgrave was a rifle cartridge invented by Ben Musgrave and introduced by Musgrave Rifles in 1969

The cartridge's design is based on necking down the .303 British, with the original intent of it being a Springbok caliber for hunting on open plains in South Africa's Karoo, Kalahari and Namakwaland.

Like the .243 Winchester it has a fast rifle twist of 1-10 inches, however if 105 grain bullets are used it is recommended that a 1-9 or even faster twist is used to stabilize the bullets.

Very few manufacturers specifically create 6mm Musgrave rounds, with PMP (Pretoria Metal Pressings) among them. However, a lot of South African distributors have the ammunition in stock.

Most bullet manufacturers offer 6mm (.243") bullets that are suitable for use with rifles chambered in 6mm Musgrave..

See also
 List of rifle cartridges
 6 mm caliber

References

Pistol and rifle cartridges
Firearms of South Africa